This is a list of administrators and governors of Bauchi State, Nigeria.
Bauchi State was formed in 1976-02-03 when North-Eastern State was divided into Bauchi, Borno, and Gongola states.

See also
States of Nigeria
List of state governors of Nigeria

References

Bauchi